Cryptic may refer to:

In science:
 Cryptic species complex, a group of species that are very difficult to distinguish from one another
 Crypsis, the ability of animals to blend in to avoid observation
 Cryptic era, earliest period of the Earth

In music:
 Cryptic (album), by Edge of Sanity
 Cryptic, a Minnesota-based music group formed by Brownmark

In games and entertainment:
 Cryptic crossword, a type of word puzzle, known colloquially as Cryptics
 Cryptic Studios, video game developer
 Cryptics, characters from the role playing game, Demon: The Fallen